Hamadan is a city in Hamedan Province, Iran.

Places
Hamedan may also refer to:
 Hamadan, East Azerbaijan
 Hamedan, Sistan and Baluchestan or Humadan
 Hamedan Province, Iran
 Hamadan County in Hamadan Province in Iran
 Hamadan Airbase, an Islamic Republic of Iran Air Force base located north of Hamadan in the Hamadān Province
 Hamadan Garrison, a military installation and village in Alvandkuh-e Gharbi Rural District, in the Central District of Hamadan County, Hamadan Province, Iran
 Hamadan International Airport

People
 Banu Hamdan, a Yemeni tribal group
 Shah-e-Hamadan, or Mir Sayyid Ali Hamadani, a Persian Sūfī of the Kubrawiya order, a poet and a Muslim scholar

See also
Hamdan, a name of Arab origin. People carrying the name 
Ecbatana, ancient capital of Media at the site of Hamadan
Hamadani (disambiguation)
Hamdani (disambiguation)